St. Mildred's-Lightbourn School (commonly referred to as just St. Mildred's and abbreviated to SMLS) is an independent all-girls school in Oakville, Ontario, Canada with approximately 550 students from Preschool to Grade 12. The Junior school includes girls from pre-school to grade five. The middle school includes grade 6, 7, and 8. The senior school goes from grade 9 to grade 12.

History 
St. Mildred's-Lightbourn School was founded by a community of  Sisters, who had traveled to Canada from various parts of England. It was first opened in Toronto as St. Mildred's College, in September 1908. In 1923, Appleby College Headmaster, John Guest, requested for Ruth Lightbourn, who was staying at her parents' house, to teach his two daughters. Parents continued to ask for Miss Lightbourn's help with their children, and soon enough there was no space left for her to do her job. She continued teaching young children from well-to-do families, in an expanded area, for thirty-seven years later.

In 1964, the Lightbourn School Board of Governors asked the Sisters of the Church to manage their school, and five years later Lightbourn School was expanded, and united as St. Mildred's Lightbourn School. The School was turned over by the Sisters to the Board of Governors in 1986.

Culture 
Students are divided into different houses upon arrival: Brant Massey, Grenfell Alexander and Cartier Vanier, whose symbols are a red and black beaver, a blue green flying moose and a green and black frog, respectively. The senior school mascot is currently a spartan after a movement to change the mascot from a pink bowed alligator wearing the school kilt called "Millie the Milligator"; she is still used frequently with the junior school students. School songs include Jubilate Deo and Blessed are the Pure in Heart.

Junior school 
The junior school program spans from pre-school to Grade 5. Academic programs include literacy, mathematics, science, social science, French, and religion, while the arts program consists of music and visual arts classes, as well as several performance opportunities. All junior school students participate in a physical education class, and students may join several extracurricular sports, such as hockey, soccer, swimming, frisbee, basketball, cross-country, and track and field.

Community events include: United Way Week, which raises money for the United Way of Oakville; a day to raise money for UNICEF on Halloween; and collection of new school supplies for KidsFest Canada.

SMLS also has several extracurriculars. One activity is the FIRST LEGO League (FLL), the "little league" of robotics, where students work as a team to build a robot and compete in a friendly, FIRST robotics event. Several activities are part of the Global Studies program. The school participates in The Duke of Edinburgh's Award Program. SMLS students must complete the requirements for the Bronze level, and are encouraged to continue on to the Silver and Gold levels. The school is also a member of the international Round Square Program; thus, it has Round Square based activities, workshops, speakers and curriculum, though it is not offered to grades 6-S2.

Middle school 
The middle school program covers Grade 6 (MS6) to Grade 8 (MS8) and balances traditional core concept teaching with inquiry-based and project learning that integrates themes across multiple subject areas. Throughout the year, girls have the opportunity to participate in a variety of opportunities to test their academic abilities which, depending on the year, include challenges such as math contests, bridge building, the Spelling Bee of Canada, the CIS Junior Speech Competition, Kids Lit Quiz, music festivals, dance festivals, and more. There are also opportunities to reach ahead and take Grade 9 courses, for further challenge.

Students may travel locally, outside the province, and/or internationally through the Global Studies Department.

Senior school 
Throughout the senior school years, Grades 9 (SS9) to Grade 12 (SS12/Grad Year), girls have a teacher advisor as well as subject-specific teachers. and invited to explore a wide range of co-curricular opportunities. There are also several major social events, including grade dances, a semi formal, and father daughter/mother daughter dances.

In SS9 and SS10, two types of courses are offered: academic and open courses. Academic courses emphasize theory and abstract problems. Open courses are designed to prepare students for further study in certain subjects and to enrich their education generally.

In SS11 to Grad Year, university and college preparation courses and open courses are offered to prepare students for their post-secondary destinations.

Technology is integrated throughout curriculum in all subjects to continue education beginning in the junior and middle schools.

All senior school students have their own personal laptop equipped with an SMLS suite of installed software. Updates are completed as necessary by the IT Department. The use of technology, including a collection of web-based applications, is not limited to computers. Student's curricular use of technology includes the following, among others: video and digital cameras, tablets, interactive projectors, sound recording, TI-83+ calculators, scientific probes, and GPS units. Technology use is guided by the Acceptable Use Policy signed by parents and students.

Global studies 
St. Mildred's offers a variety of opportunities for students to participate in exchanges and travel to other areas on the globe.  Students are required to complete the bronze level of The Duke of Edinburgh's Award before graduation and are encouraged to continue on to the Silver and Gold levels.

All middle school students work toward the Junior Duke Award, focusing on many of the skills of the Duke of Edinburgh's Award program. Girls in JS3 – JS55 begin their Global Studies journey through participation in the "Millie 100" Program. As early as JS4, students experience their first overnight trip with the school. Then in JS4 and beyond, girls may go to various trips such as overnight camping, high ropes courses, winter survival skills, and learning to paddle a variety of water craft.

All middle school students take part in a 4-day outdoor integrated educational experience with A.L.I.V.E. Outdoors, which combines outdoor work with planned workshops.

Sports 
The school offers several sports:

Extracurricular activities

Footnotes

External links 
 St. Mildred's – Lightbourn School
 S.W.A.T. 771, St. Mildred's Lightbourn School's Robotics Team
 Our Kids – School Profile

High schools in Oakville, Ontario
Private schools in Ontario
Anglican schools in Canada
Educational institutions established in 1908
1908 establishments in Ontario